Blaze Starr Goes Nudist is a 1962 nudist film, produced and directed by Doris Wishman. The film stars legendary burlesque queen Blaze Starr and crooner Ralph Young (as "Russ Martine").

The film was also released under the bowdlerized title Blaze Starr Goes Back to Nature.

Plot
Screen siren Blaze Starr (Starr) is tired of the rigors of celebrity life. After wandering into a screening of a nudist exploitation film, she travels to Sunny Palms Lodge, a nearby nudist camp, to apply for membership. Blaze enjoys the relaxed atmosphere the camp offers and becomes friends with the camp's director, Andy Simms (Young). Her lack of interest in her professional life quickly becomes apparent to her manager / boyfriend Tony (Berk), however, who worries that Blaze will lose her acting contract if the studio finds out she's a nudist. As fate would have it, it turns out the studio head endorses the nudist lifestyle, and Blaze and Andy start a new romance.

Cast
 Blaze Starr as Blaze Starr
 Ralph Young (as "Russ Martine") as Andy Simms
 Gene Berk as Tony
 William Meyer
 Sandra Sinclair
 Stephen Bloom
 Bunny Downe
 James Antonio

Locations

The nude scenes were filmed at Sunny Palms Lodge in Homestead, Florida.

See also
List of American films of 1963
 List of American films of 1962

References

External links

1963 films
1960s English-language films
American sexploitation films
Films directed by Doris Wishman
Homestead, Florida
Films about striptease
1960s American films